PNS Khaibar (DDG-183) is the  currently in active duty in the Surface Command of the Pakistan Navy since 1994.

The modernization and midlife upgrade program by the KSEW Ltd. at the Naval Base Karachi reclassified her status as guided missile destroyer.

Service history

Acquisition, construction, and modernization

Designed and constructed by the Yarrow Shipbuilders, Ltd. at Glasgow in Scotland, she was laid down on 28 September 1972, and was launched on 5 February 1974. During her service with the Royal Navy, she was notable for her wartime operations during the Falklands War with Argentina.

On 1 March 1994, she was purchased by Pakistan after the successful negotiation with the United Kingdom and sailed from the Port of Plymouth to the Port of Karachi, arriving on 26 June 1994.

Upon arriving in Karachi, she underwent an extensive modernization and a mid-life upgrade program by the KSEW Ltd. at the Naval Base Karachi in 1998–2002.

She was named after the battle of Khaybar in Medina in the year 628, and was commissioned on 1 March 1994.

Her wartime performance included in deployments in patrolling off the Gulf of Aden, Gulf of Oman, Persian Gulf, Arabian Sea as well as deploying in the Mediterranean Sea when she was part of the multinational CTF-150.

Gallery

References

External links

Media files
 

1974 ships
Tariq-class destroyers
Ships built in Pakistan